Trans Student Educational Resources (TSER) is a United States-based organization that seeks to promote the wellbeing of transgender youth. It was founded in 2011 by teen activists. It is the only national organization led by transgender youth.

TSER provides resources to the public on how to support trans students, such as safe schools trainings for teachers, online infographics, and workshops at conferences. It is most notable for its members' work in media focused on transgender educational justice.

Mission 
TSER's mission statement reads,

History 
Founded in 2011 by two 16-year-old trans women, Trans Student Educational Resources began as an effort to start transgender policies in school districts in the United States and get more young trans people involved in activism. At that time, there were very few enumerated anti-discrimination policies in place around the country and there was a lack of visual resources on transgender issues. In 2012, TSER began its infographic series, which expanded its audience and member participation. TSER is also involved in the organizing of the annual International Transgender Day of Visibility - a worldwide effort to raise promote the wellbeing of transgender people and to celebrate their successes.

Work 

In 2012, TSER began publishing transgender-related infographics. Following its success, the organization released dozens more. According to director Eli Erlick, TSER's graphics have been publicized by millions of blogs, web sites, and organizations and have been influential in educating the public on transgender issues. TSER staff have focused on their mission statement of "advocacy and empowerment" through speaking at conferences and providing information to those that need it.

TSER also engages in trans youth leadership development, trainings for organizations, teachers, and students, media advocacy, and the creation of a scholarship program for trans students. In 2014, multiple members of TSER advocated in media for trans-inclusivity at women's colleges.

The Gender Unicorn 

TSER created the Gender Unicorn in 2014 to describe the spectrums of gender and sexuality. It was quickly picked up by schools, colleges, and universities across the world and has been translated into over a dozen languages.

In 2016, it was criticized by conservative Christians, such as blogger Matt Walsh at Blaze Media and evangelist Franklin Graham, based on misunderstandings and/or misrepresentations of what the schools in Charlotte, North Carolina were teaching. In 2017, the Gender Unicorn was discussed in the Senate of Canada during debate regarding Bill C-16.

Name 

In 2014, the organization changed its name from Trans Student Equality Resources to Trans Student Educational Resources, citing that equality is "not enough" for the transgender community.

See also

LGBT rights in the United States
List of LGBT rights organizations

References

External links
 TSER Official Website
 TSER Blog
 TSER Facebook

Education in the United States
LGBT and education
LGBT political advocacy groups in the United States
LGBT youth
LGBT youth organizations based in the United States
Transgender organizations in the United States
Organizations established in 2011
2011 establishments in the United States